Suba Games, LLC is an online games publisher. Launched in August 2008, Suba Games' first title was the North American launch of ACE Online. At about the same time, Suba Games also launched Priston Tale and Priston Tale 2 that came as a result from a strategic partnership with leading Korean publisher, Yedang Online. In August 2010, Suba Games brought the browser-based MMO, Fragoria, into the North American market. One month later, they launched their FPS, Mission Against Terror, into Open Beta.

Notable games 

Ace Online
DOMO (Dream of Mirror Online)
Fragoria
Mission Against Terror
Pirate Galaxy
Priston Tale
 Priston Tale 2

References 

Video game publishers
Video game companies of Canada